Běleč is a municipality and village in Brno-Country District in the South Moravian Region of the Czech Republic. It has about 200 inhabitants.

Administrative parts
The village of Křeptov is an administrative part of Běleč.

References

Villages in Brno-Country District